Donn M. Roberts (September 28, 1867 – August 3, 1936) was the mayor of Terre Haute, Indiana from 1913 to 1915.

Biography
He was born in Annapolis, Illinois to William Henry Roberts and Octavia Bruner. On July 3, 1889, in Indianapolis, Indiana he married Mary Grace Tiernan.

He was the Democratic mayor of Terre Haute, Indiana from 1913 to 1915. He was convicted of bribery in 1915 and spent three and a half years in Leavenworth prison of his six-year sentence.

He was buried in St. Joseph's Cemetery.

See also

List of mayors of Terre Haute, Indiana

References

1867 births
1936 deaths
People from Crawford County, Illinois
Prisoners and detainees of the United States federal government
Mayors of Terre Haute, Indiana
American prisoners and detainees
American politicians convicted of bribery
Indiana politicians convicted of crimes